The Duchy of Pomerania-Schlawe, also known as the Duchy of Sławno, was a feudal duchy with its capital in Sławno, located in Pomerania within the Holy Roman Empire. It was formed in 1190, when it separated from Pomerania-Stettin. In 1238 it was conquered and incorporated into the Duchy of Gdańsk.

History 
The duchy was formed in 1190 when it separated from Pomerania-Stettin. It was a feudal duchy within the Holy Roman Empire. The state was located in the Schlawe and Stolp Land in the Pomerania and its capital was Sławno. Bogislaw III became the ruler of the country. His existence remain contested, instead being proposed by some historians to be Bogusław I or Bogislaw II. After his death, he was succsided by Ratibor II, whose existence also remains contested. Instead, he is sometimes proposed to be Ratibor of Białogarda or Racibor Bogusławowic. Between 1236 and 1238, the duchy was conquered and incorporated into the Duchy of Gdańsk.

List of rulers 
 Bogislaw III (1190–1223)
 Note: theorised to be Bogusław I or Bogislaw II
 Ratibor II (1223–1226/1238)
 Note: theorised to be Ratibor of Białogarda or Racibor Bogusławowic

Notes

References 

Former countries in Europe
Former monarchies of Europe
Duchies of the Holy Roman Empire
Schlawe
12th-century establishments in Europe
13th-century disestablishments in Europe
12th century in the Holy Roman Empire
13th century in the Holy Roman Empire
States and territories established in 1190
States and territories disestablished in the 1230s